Knorr-Bremse AG is a German manufacturer of braking systems for rail and commercial vehicles that has operated in the field for over 110 years. Other products in Group's portfolio include intelligent door systems, control components, air conditioning systems for rail vehicles, torsional vibration dampers, and transmission control systems for commercial vehicles.
In 2019, the Group's workforce of over 28,000 achieved worldwide sales of EUR 6.93 billion.

The Group has a presence in over 30 countries, at 100 locations.

On 4 November 2020, it was announced that Knorr-Bremse AG had chosen Dr. Jan Michael Mrosik to be a member of the Executive Board and CEO. The appointment takes effect as of 1 January 2021.

History

Foundation 
Engineer Georg Knorr established Knorr-Bremse GmbH in 1905 in Boxhagen-Rummelsburg, Neue Bahnhofstraße, near Berlin (since 1920 part of Berlin-Friedrichshain). Its production of railway braking systems derived from a company ("Carpenter & Schulze") founded in 1883. In 1911 the company merged with "Continentale Bremsen-GmbH" to found Knorr-Bremse Aktiengesellschaft (AG). From 1913 onwards, a second manufacturing plant, new headquarters, a heating plant and other annex buildings were erected.

The initial basis for Knorr's commercial success was provided by an agreement with the Prussian State Railways, which at that time had formed the Prussian-Hessian Railway Company, to supply single-chamber express braking systems, first for passenger and later on for freight trains. A compressed-air brake, the "Knorr Druckluft-Einkammerschnellbremse" (K1), along with its derivatives, offered considerably enhanced safety performance compared with traditional systems.

In the early twentieth century, train guards still had to operate brakes by hand, from so-called "brake vans". The first pneumatic brakes were of a basic design, but before long, indirect automatic systems using control valves were developed. See History of rail transport in Germany for an overview.

Expansion 
In 1920 the manufacturing plant of the first Bayerische Motoren-Werke AG (BMW, established in 1917/1918) located in Munich, Moosacher Straße, became a subsidiary of Knorr-Bremse, delivering brake systems as Süddeutsche Bremsen-AG for the Bavarian Group Administration, the former "Royal Bavarian State Railways". 
There was no further interest in motor engines for aircraft and automobiles. The engine construction and the company name "BMW" were sold in 1922 to financier Camillo Castiglioni to be combined with the Bayerische Flugzeugwerke AG (BFW, located not far away), establishing the company a second time. For details see History of BMW and BFW/Messerschmitt.

1922 until 1927 the new main manufacturing plant in Berlin at the Hirschberger Straße/Schreiberhauer Straße next to the Berlin Ringbahn was erected, a tunnelled road combined both the old and the new site.

The second main area of activity emerged in 1922, when Knorr moved into pneumatic braking systems for commercial road vehicles. The company was the first in Europe to develop a system that applied the brakes simultaneously to all four wheels of a truck as well as its trailer. The resultant reduction in braking distances made a significant contribution to improving road safety.

A small number of the Swedish light MG35/36 machine guns AKA "Knorr-Bremse machine guns" were also manufactured by Knorr-Bremse for the Wehrmacht during the Second World War.

Re-establishment 
The company is relocated at the Süddeutsche Bremsen-AG plant in Munich, the former sites in the eastern part of Berlin being expropriated after 1945.

Timeline

Products

Rail vehicles
Knorr-Bremse not only produces complete braking systems for all types of rolling stock but also door systems, toilets, air conditioning, couplings and windscreen wipers. In 2000, it purchased British manufacturer, Westinghouse Brakes (formerly the brakes division of Westinghouse Brake and Signal Company Ltd), from Invensys, and subsequently moved its operations from Chippenham to the nearby English town of Melksham, Wiltshire.

Since 2002, Knorr-Bremse has been working on variable gauge systems for more efficient solutions to break of gauge problems.

Commercial vehicles 
Knorr-Bremse has been developing and manufacturing braking systems for commercial vehicles since 1920, for trucks and semi-trailer tractor units over 6 tonnes, buses, trailers or special vehicles.

See also 
 New York Air Brake
 Robert Bosch GmbH
 Westinghouse Air Brake Company

References

External links
Knorr-Bremse Website
Bendix Commercial Vehicle Systems LLC

German brands
Rail industry manufacturing companies
Manufacturing companies based in Munich
Companies established in 1905
1905 establishments in Germany
Companies in the MDAX